In dynamical systems and ergodic theory, the concept of a wandering set formalizes a certain idea of movement and mixing. When a dynamical system has a wandering set of non-zero measure, then the system is a dissipative system. This is the opposite of a conservative system, to which the Poincaré recurrence theorem applies. Intuitively, the connection between wandering sets and dissipation is easily understood: if a portion of the phase space "wanders away" during normal time-evolution of the system, and is never visited again, then the system is dissipative.  The language of wandering sets can be used to give a precise, mathematical definition to the concept of a dissipative system.  The notion of wandering sets in phase space was introduced by Birkhoff in 1927.

Wandering points
A common, discrete-time definition of wandering sets starts with a map  of a topological space X. A point  is said to be a wandering point if there is a neighbourhood U of x and a positive integer N such that for all , the iterated map is non-intersecting:

A handier definition requires only that the intersection have measure zero. To be precise, the definition requires that X be a measure space, i.e. part of a triple  of Borel sets  and a measure  such that

for all . Similarly, a continuous-time system will have a map  defining the time evolution or flow of the system, with the time-evolution operator  being a one-parameter continuous abelian group action on X:

In such a case, a wandering point  will have a neighbourhood U of x and a time T such that for all times , the time-evolved map is of measure zero:

These simpler definitions may be fully generalized to the group action of a topological group. Let  be a measure space, that is, a set with a measure defined on its Borel subsets.  Let   be a group acting on that set. Given a point , the set

is called the trajectory or orbit of the point x.

An element  is called a wandering point if there exists a neighborhood U of x and a neighborhood V of the identity in   such that 

for all .

Non-wandering points
A non-wandering point is the opposite. In the discrete case,  is non-wandering if, for every open set U containing x and every N > 0, there is some n > N such that

Similar definitions follow for the continuous-time and discrete and continuous group actions.

Wandering sets and dissipative systems
A wandering set is a collection of wandering points.

is a set of measure zero.

The concept of a wandering set is in a sense dual to the ideas expressed in the Poincaré recurrence theorem. If there is no such wandering set, the action is said to be , and the system is a conservative system. For example, any system for which the Poincaré recurrence theorem holds cannot have, by definition, a wandering set of positive measure; and is thus an example of a conservative system.

Define the trajectory of a wandering set W as

is a set of measure zero.

The Hopf decomposition states that every measure space with a non-singular transformation can be decomposed into an invariant conservative set and an invariant wandering set.

See also
 No wandering domain theorem

References
 
 Alexandre I. Danilenko and Cesar E. Silva (8 April 2009). Ergodic theory: Nonsingular transformations; See Arxiv arXiv:0803.2424.
 

Ergodic theory
Limit sets
Dynamical systems